Emily Elizabeth Carpenter  (20 January 1917 – 14 March 1991) was a New Zealand university tutor in home science, adult educationalist and consumer advocate. She was born in Scargill, North Canterbury, New Zealand, on 20 January 1917.

In the 1985 New Year Honours, Carpenter was appointed a Companion of the Order of St Michael and St George, for services to the Consumer Council and home science.

References

1917 births
1991 deaths
New Zealand educators
New Zealand Companions of the Order of St Michael and St George
People from North Canterbury